Pesarvai is a village located in Gadivemula Mandal, Kurnool District, Andhra Pradesh, India.

References

Villages in Kurnool district